The 79th Infantry Division (79-ya Pekhotnaya Diviziya) was an infantry formation of the Russian Imperial Army.

Organization
1st Brigade
313th Infantry Regiment
314th Infantry Regiment
2nd Brigade
315th Infantry Regiment
316th Infantry Regiment
79th Artillery Brigade

References

Infantry divisions of the Russian Empire
Military units and formations disestablished in 1918